Markus Felfernig (born 18 June 1983) is an Austrian professional association football player currently playing for Austrian Football Bundesliga side Kapfenberger SV. He plays as a midfielder.

External links
 

1983 births
Living people
Austrian footballers
Association football midfielders
FC Red Bull Salzburg players
Kapfenberger SV players